Hemalkasa is a village in the Bhamragad taluka of Gadchiroli district in Maharashtra State, India.

It belongs to the Madia Gond community.

Hemalkasa is where the famous Magsaysay Award-winner couple Dr. Prakash Baba Amte and Dr. Mandakini Amte manage the Lok Biradari Prakalp project.

References 

Villages in Gadchiroli district